Alexander Ferguson Anderson (15 November 1921 – 18 January 1999) was a Scottish footballer, who played as a full-back. Anderson began his career in the mid-1940s with St Johnstone, spending a year with the Perth side before moving to Forfar Athletic.

In 1949, Anderson moved south to Southampton, spending three years as backup to England right-back Bill Ellerington before short spells with Exeter City and Dundee United. Released after playing just a few games with United, It is unknown where Anderson's career headed after his short time at Tannadice, though he did appear at then Southern League club Cheltenham Town in the 1950s.

Death
Anderson died in January 1999, aged 77.

References

External links

1921 births
1999 deaths
People from Monifieth
Scottish footballers
Scottish Football League players
St Johnstone F.C. players
Forfar Athletic F.C. players
Southampton F.C. players
Exeter City F.C. players
Dundee United F.C. players
Cheltenham Town F.C. players
Association football fullbacks
English Football League players
Footballers from Angus, Scotland